Lucyan David Mech (born January 18, 1937), also known as Dave Mech, is an American biologist specializing in the study of wolves. He is a senior research scientist for the U.S. Geological Survey and an adjunct professor at the University of Minnesota. He has researched wolves since 1958 in locations including northern Minnesota, Isle Royale,  Alaska, Yellowstone National Park, Ellesmere Island, and Italy.

Mech is the founder of the International Wolf Center and is the vice-chair of its board of directors. The project to create the facility, which he started in 1985, was a natural outgrowth of his wolf research as well as his ambition to educate people about the nature of wolves that they may come to respect the creature through understanding.

He has published eleven books about wolves and other wildlife, including The Wolf: The Ecology and Behavior of an Endangered Species (1970, University of Minnesota Press) and Wolves: Behavior, Ecology, and Conservation which he co-edited with Luigi Boitani (2003, University of Chicago Press). Both books remain in print as of 2017.  The 1997 book The Arctic Wolf: Ten Years with the Pack received an Honorable Mention by the National Outdoor Book Award (Nature and the Environment category).  His latest book with Doug Smith and Dan MacNulty is Wolves on the Hunt:  the Behavior of Wolves Hunting Wild Prey.

Early years
Mech was born in Auburn, New York, and raised in Syracuse.

Career and research

Mech obtained a B.S. degree in conservation from Cornell University in 1958. and a Ph.D. in wildlife ecology from Purdue University in 1962. 
From 1958 to 1962 Mech was a graduate student at Purdue University studying the wolves of Isle Royale in Lake Superior.  His first book was The Wolves of Isle Royale, published in 1966 by the Department of the Interior, having evolved from his doctoral thesis.   In 1966 he went to study wolves in the Superior National Forest in Minnesota.

"Beginning in 1986, the legendary biologist L. David Mech spent 25 summers observing wolves..." on Ellesmere Island.  Mech said that his research on the wolves at Ellesmere Island was different because it is  one of the few places where the wolves are not afraid of people, making that experience one of the best in his life.  This project  in 1986 when photographer Jim Brandenburg told him of white wolves he had seen on Ellesmere Island during an assignment for National Geographic. Mech recognized the rare  opportunity to study wolves that had never been hunted and had little fear of humans.  Also there were no trees or bushes to hide them from view in the tundra.  In the summer Mech found the den near the military and weather base at Eureka.  They witnessed the interactions within the pack and the wolves hunting musk oxen.  This type of research had not been done before. In an interview Mech said "The kind of stuff I got here was not just the objective behavioral stuff, but the kind of thing you get from living with a pet of some sort. You get an insight into the thing. You get to know the animal." Mech and Brandenburg together produced several articles and a film for National Geographic.

Positions on hunting, fishing and trapping and wolf management 
An avid mushroom hunter and fur trapper, Mech has continued to support fishing, hunting, and trapping, which has led to criticism from animal protectionists. He believes that states can manage wolves sustainably, and that states where the wolf were no longer on the endangered list should determine how wolves should be managed in their state. On his website, he lists mink trapping as one of his  interests. He closed the abstract to "Is science in danger of sanctifying the wolf?"  published in the January 2012 issue of Biological Conservation with "The wolf is neither a saint nor a sinner except to those who want to make it so."

Publication

Mech's first book was published in 1966 and has written eleven published books. He has published approximately 380 scientific papers and 100 popular articles about wolves and other wildlife including The Wolf: The Ecology and Behavior of an Endangered Species (1970, University of Minnesota Press) and Wolves: Behavior, Ecology, and Conservation which he co-edited with Luigi Boitani (2003, University of Chicago Press). Both books remain in print as of 2017.  The 1997 book The Arctic Wolf: Ten Years with the Pack received an Honorable Mention by the National Outdoor Book Award (Nature and the Environment category).  His latest book with Doug Smith and Dan MacNulty is Wolves on the Hunt:  the Behavior of Wolves Hunting Wild Prey.  The International Wolf Center lists approximately 140 articles written by Mech published during the period of 1987 to the present, primarily in scientific journals.

References

External links 

Dave Mech's personal site
 
 

Living people
21st-century American biologists
Cornell University alumni
United States Geological Survey personnel
1937 births
United States Department of the Interior officials
People from Auburn, New York
People from Syracuse, New York
21st-century American zoologists
American mammalogists
University of Minnesota faculty
Humans and wolves